The Baimai Springs are a group of artesian karst springs located in , Zhangqiu District, Jinan, Shandong Province, China about 25 kilometres west from the city centre of Jinan. The site of the springs is renowned for its natural beauty and as the one-time residence of the female Song Dynasty poet Li Qingzhao.

The Baimai Spring proper is located in the courtyard of the Dragon Spring Temple. Its spring pool covers a rectangular area of 25 by 14.5 metres and has a depth of 2 metres. The springs and the historical buildings that surround them are part of a public park (Baimai Spring Park). The park was established in 1985 and covers an area of 25 hectares. Besides the springs, it also contains some small lakes, such as Wanquan Lake (literally "10,000 Springs Lake") that are fed by the springs. Within the park, the Qingzhao Ci Poetry Garden is laid out according to the aesthetic principles of ci poetry with the four romantic themes: wind, flowers, snow, and moon.

Springs in the group

 Baimai Spring
 Dongmawan Spring
 Mo Spring (literally "Black Ink Spring")
 Plum Blossom Spring

Location
The street address of the park is Number 31 Huiquan Road, Mingshui, Zhangqiu, Shandong, China.

See also
List of sites in Jinan

References

External links
blog entry on Baimai Springs

Springs of China